Zion is a concept album written and performed by the guitarist Phil Keaggy as a tribute to the master guitarmaker Ken Hoover at Zion guitars. Though Ken is being racked by a progressively destructive disease, unable to handcraft guitars himself, he still works at the Zion guitars workshop.

All the songs on the album are played on the very same Zion Radicaster that Ken made for Phil.

2000 albums
Phil Keaggy albums